Vice Admiral Charles Morris Winton ('Chuck') Thomas  (31 May 1936 – 30 September 2022) was a Canadian Forces officer who served as Vice Chief of the Defence Staff.

Career
Thomas joined the Royal Canadian Navy in 1954. He became Commanding Officer of the destroyer  in 1971, Senior Staff Officer (Training) in 1973 and Senior Staff Officer (Combat Readiness) in 1973. He went on to be Chief of Staff (Personnel & Training) in 1975, Commanding Officer of the 4th Canadian Escort Squadron in 1976 and Director Maritime Requirements (Sea)  at the National Defence Headquarters in 1979. After that he was Director General Maritime Doctrine and Operations in 1982, Chief of Maritime Doctrine and Operations in 1984 and Commander Maritime Command in 1987. His last appointment was as Vice Chief of the Defence Staff in 1989 before resigning over policy issues in 1991. His resignation reflected his belief that the Canadian Government should have been reducing the network of 40 armed forces bases rather than just reducing the headcount. General John de Chastelain, Chief of the Defence Staff, responded attacking Thomas' motives rather than responding to his concerns.

Thomas died on 30 September 2022.

Awards and decorations
Thomas's personal awards and decorations include the following:

File:CD-ribbon and 2 bars.png

References

|-

1936 births
Canadian admirals
Living people
People from Kelowna
Commanders of the Order of Military Merit (Canada)
Vice Chiefs of the Defence Staff (Canada)
Commanders of the Royal Canadian Navy
Canadian military personnel from British Columbia